Hossein Kazemi (born October 3, 1979 in Tehran, Iran) is retired Iranian football player who last played for Aluminium in Azadegan League. He has also featured in an episode of a TV serie in Iran, with former Esteghlal team-mate, Ali Ansarian.

Club career
After starting his career at his hometown club Saipa, he later moved to Pro League rivals Esteghlal He was an on-and-off player during the 2004–05 season, but became a pivotal part in the season and won a fixed spot in stacked midfield. He has scored a number of important goals for Esteghlal. After the 2006–07 season, he moved from Esteghlal to rivals Sepahan. He remained at Sepahan for the 2007–08 season before return to Esteghlal. With Sepahan, he reached the 2007 AFC Champions League final in which Sepahan was defeated.

His good performances have earned him a number of caps in Team Melli. During the management of Ali Daei as Team Melli head coach, he had become an important member of the national team. Though, under new Esteghlal coach, Samad Marfavi, he became a substitute player during the first weeks of the season. This led to him not being nominated for the crucial 2011 AFC Asian Cup Qualifiers against Jordan. After spending two seasons with Esteghlal, he joined Steel Azin, where he stayed for a season before joining Rah Ahan in 2011 where he joined Daei and stayed for a season. He joined Mes Kerman for 2012–13 season and moved to Fajr Sepasi halfway through the season as he did not get any playing time in Mes. He signed with Aluminium in summer 2013 for one season.

Club career statistics

Assists

International career
He was called up to join the Iranian national team for the first time in August 2006, and made his debut for Iran in a friendly match against the UAE national team. He has later been called up regularly for national team games. Under the spell of Ali Daei he played in 2008 West Asian Football Federation Championship, 2011 AFC Asian Cup qualification and 2010 FIFA World Cup qualification.

International goals 
Scores and results list Iran's goal tally first.

Honours

Club
Esteghlal
Iran Pro League (2): 2005–06, 2008–09

Sepahan
AFC Champions League:
Runner-up (1): 2007
Iran Pro League:
Runner-up (1): 2007–08

Country
WAFF Championship (1): 2008

References
Iran Pro League Stats

1979 births
Living people
Iranian footballers
Esteghlal F.C. players
Sepahan S.C. footballers
Steel Azin F.C. players
Rah Ahan players
Persian Gulf Pro League players
Azadegan League players
Iran international footballers
Association football midfielders